Marion Rousse (born 17 August 1991) is a French former racing cyclist. She won the French national road race title in 2012. She announced her retirement from racing in October 2015.
Rousse is the cousin of racing cyclists David Lefèvre, Laurent Lefèvre and Olivier Bonnaire. Outside racing, Rousse has also worked as a pundit for Eurosport and France Télévisions. Since 2019 she has also served as deputy director of the Tour de la Provence. In 2021, she became race director of the Tour de France Femmes.

Personal life 
Rousse married fellow racing cyclist and Tour de France stage winner Tony Gallopin in October 2014. In February 2020 she announced via an Instagram post that the couple had separated. Two months later Julian Alaphilippe announced in an interview with L'Équipe that he and Rousse were in a relationship. In January 2021 Alaphilippe announced via social media that the couple were expecting a child. Their son was born 14 June 2021.

References

External links

1991 births
Living people
French female cyclists
People from Saint-Saulve
Sportspeople from Nord (French department)
Cycling announcers
Cyclists from Hauts-de-France
21st-century French women